The 2018 Club Deportivo Universidad Católica season is the 78th season and the club's 44st consecutive season in the top flight of Chilean football. In addition to the domestic league, Universidad Católica are participating in this season's editions of the Copa Chile.

Squad

Transfers

In

Out

Loans in

Loans out

Competitions

Overview

Primera Division

League table

Results summary

Results by round

Matches

Copa Chile

Second round

Statistics

Squad statistics

† Player left Universidad Católica during the season

Goals

Last updated: December 2018
Source: Soccerway

Assists

Last updated: December 2018
Source: Soccerway

Clean sheets

*Last updated: December 2018
Source: Soccerway

References

External links

2018